McLean County is a county in the U.S. state of North Dakota. As of the 2020 census, the population was 9,771. Its county seat is Washburn.

History
The Dakota Territory legislature created the county on March 8, 1883, with areas partitioned from Burleigh, Sheridan, and (now-extinct) Stevens counties. The county was named for John A. McLean, the first mayor of Bismarck. The county organization was completed on November 1 of that year. Its boundaries were altered in 1885, in 1892, and in 1908. It has retained its current configuration since November 3, 1908, when a portion of its previous territory was partitioned to recreate Sheridan County (Sheridan had been dissolved on November 8, 1892,  with its territory annexed to McLean).

Geography
The county's western boundary is delineated by Lake Sakakawea, created in 1956 by construction of Garrison Dam at the county's southwestern edge. The southwestern boundary of the county is delineated by the Missouri River as it continues its southeastward flow from the lake. The county terrain consists of rolling hills, dotted with lakes and ponds in its eastern portion. The area is largely devoted to agriculture. The terrain slopes to the south and east, with its highest point on the north boundary line near its NW corner, at 2,201' (671m) ASL. It is the third-largest county in North Dakota by land area and second-largest by total area.

Major highways

  U.S. Highway 83
  North Dakota Highway 28
  North Dakota Highway 37
  North Dakota Highway 53
  North Dakota Highway 41
  North Dakota Highway 200
  North Dakota Highway 1804

Adjacent counties

 Ward County - north
 McHenry County - northeast
 Sheridan County - east
 Burleigh County - southeast
 Oliver County - south
 Mercer County - southwest
 Dunn County - west
 Mountrail County - northwest

Protected areas

 Audubon National Wildlife Refuge
 Camp Lake National Wildlife Refuge
 De Trobriand State Game Management Area
 Douglas Creek Public Use Area
 Hiddenwood National Wildlife Refuge
 Lake Nettie National Wildlife Refuge
 Lake Otis National Wildlife Refuge
 Lake Susie National Wildlife Refuge
 Lost Lake National Wildlife Refuge
 McLean National Wildlife Refuge
 Riverdale State Game Management Area
 Totten Trail Park
 Wilton Mine State Game Management Area (part)

Lakes

 Blackwater Lake
 Blue Lake
 Brumwell Slough
 Camp Lake
 Cherry Lake (part)
 Cottonwood Lake
 Crooked Lake
 Lake Audubon
 Lake Brekken
 Lake Holmes
 Lake Margaret
 Lake Nettie
 Lake Ordway
 Lake Williams
 Lost Lake
 Minehan Slough
 Nelson Lake
 Otis Lake
 Painted Woods Lake
 Pelican Lake
 Peterson Lake
 Postel Lake (part)
 Strawberry Lake
 Turtle Lake
 Wildwood Lake
 Yanktonal Lake

Demographics

2000 census
As of the 2020 census, there were 9,311 people, 3,815 households, and 2,712 families in the county. The population density was 4.41/sqmi (1.70/km2). There were 5,264 housing units at an average density of 2.49/sqmi (0.96/km2). The racial makeup of the county was 92.52% White, 0.02% Black or African American, 5.95% Native American, 0.12% Asian, 0.01% Pacific Islander, 0.19% from other races, and 1.18% from two or more races. 0.87% of the population were Hispanic or Latino of any race. 48.6% were of German and 22.1% Norwegian ancestry.

There were 3,815 households, out of which 29.30% had children under the age of 18 living with them, 62.30% were married couples living together, 5.60% had a female householder with no husband present, and 28.90% were non-families. 26.60% of all households were made up of individuals, and 14.30% had someone living alone who was 65 years of age or older. The average household size was 2.40 and the average family size was 2.88.

The county population contained 23.80% under the age of 18, 5.10% from 18 to 24, 22.70% from 25 to 44, 27.90% from 45 to 64, and 20.40% who were 65 years of age or older. The median age was 44 years. For every 100 females there were 98.20 males. For every 100 females age 18 and over, there were 97.60 males.

The median income for a household in the county was $32,337, and the median income for a family was $39,604. Males had a median income of $32,376 versus $18,224 for females. The per capita income for the county was $16,220. About 10.40% of families and 13.50% of the population were below the poverty line, including 17.30% of those under age 18 and 12.90% of those age 65 or over.

2010 census
As of the 2010 census, there were 8,962 people, 3,897 households, and 2,600 families residing in the county. The population density was 4.25/sqmi (1.64/km2). There were 5,590 housing units at an average density of 2.65/sqmi (1.02/km2). The racial makeup of the county was 91.0% white, 7.0% American Indian, 0.1% black or African American, 0.1% Asian, 0.2% from other races, and 1.5% from two or more races. Those of Hispanic or Latino origin made up 1.2% of the population. In terms of ancestry, 54.4% were German, 24.6% were Norwegian, 6.5% were Irish, 5.6% were Swedish, 5.1% were English, and 3.6% were American.

Of the 3,897 households, 23.0% had children under the age of 18 living with them, 57.8% were married couples living together, 5.1% had a female householder with no husband present, 33.3% were non-families, and 29.0% of all households were made up of individuals. The average household size was 2.25 and the average family size was 2.75. The median age was 49.1 years.

The median income for a household in the county was $52,922 and the median income for a family was $62,686. Males had a median income of $48,906 versus $29,431 for females. The per capita income for the county was $27,029. About 6.5% of families and 9.3% of the population were below the poverty line, including 12.5% of those under age 18 and 13.3% of those age 65 or over.

Communities

Cities

 Benedict
 Butte
 Coleharbor
 Garrison
 Max
 Mercer
 Riverdale
 Ruso
 Turtle Lake
 Underwood
 Washburn (county seat)
 Wilton (partly in Burleigh County)

Census-designated place
 White Shield

Unincorporated communities

 Falkirk
 Merida
 Raub
 Roseglen

Townships

 Amundsville
 Andrews
 Aurena
 Blackwater
 Blue Hill
 Butte
 Byersville
 Cremerville
 Deepwater
 Dogden
 Douglas
 Gate
 Greatstone
 Horseshoe Valley
 Lake Williams
 Longfellow
 Loquemont
 Malcolm
 McGinnis
 Medicine Hill
 Mercer
 Otis
 Roseglen
 Rosemont
 Saint Mary
 Snow
 Turtle Lake
 Victoria
 Wise

Communities flooded by Garrison Dam

 Beaver Creek
 Charging Eagle
 Elbowoods
 Independence
 Lucky Mound
 Nishu
 Red Butte (Mandan community)
 Shell Creek

Politics
McLean County voters have voted Republican for decades. In only one national election since 1964 has the county selected the Democratic Party candidate (as of 2020).

See also
 National Register of Historic Places listings in McLean County, North Dakota

References

Further reading
 Mary Ann Barnes Williams, Pioneer Days of Washburn, N. Dakota and Vicinity. Washburn ND: Washburn Leader, 1936.
 McLean County Heritage. Washburn ND: McLean County Historical Society, 1978.

External links
 McLean County maps, Sheet 1 (western), Sheet 2 (northeast), and Sheet 3 (southeast), North Dakota DOT

 
North Dakota counties on the Missouri River
1883 establishments in Dakota Territory
Populated places established in 1883